John Aubyn (fl. 1377–1382) was an English politician.

He was a Member (MP) of the Parliament of England for Reigate in January 1377, 1378 and October 1382. His son, John Aubyn, junior, was also an MP for Reigate.

References

Year of birth missing
Year of death missing
English MPs January 1377
English MPs 1378
English MPs October 1382